Sommerloch is a municipality in the district of Bad Kreuznach  administrative region in Rhineland-Palatinate, in western Germany.

Geography

Location
Sommerloch lies 12km northwest of Bad Kreuznach in the vicinity of the Nahe Valley, on the edge of the Soonwalds. The village is surrounded by vineyards. Seven wineries grow about 100 hectares of vines, primarily Riesling grapes. This wine region is not far from the "middle" Rhine River, just 25km from Bingen am Rhein or 33 km from Ingelheim am Rhein.

In the town on Weinbergstraße (Wine Mountain Street) is Saint Aegidius Roman Catholic church built in 1789.

Nearby villages include Sankt Katharinen, Braunweiler and Wallhausen.

History

A valley, not a summer hole 
In the 1158 Sommerloch was mentioned as managed by the Rupert Monastery of Bingen.  In the first documents, the area was noted as "Sumerlachen". Later the location was ruled by the Herrschaft Dalberg.

The name originally referred to the location as being a wet basin or a wet valley. Today the village is situated in a pleasant valley surrounded by hills planted with rows of grapes.

The Schünemann house also belongs to Sommerloch.

The German newsmedia term Sommerloch refers to a boring time in the summer when news is lacking.

Alternatively, the popular translation of the German word Sommerloch is in English "silly season".

Religion
The population of Sommerloch is mostly Roman Catholic. Saint Aegidius is the only church in the village; built in 1789. The church is managed by the church staff of nearby Wallhausen.

Council and Mayor
The Sommerloch council consists of eight council members. The members are voluntary; the mayor is the council chairman.

Local mayor is Thomas Haßlinger. In the local elections on May 26, 2019, he was confirmed in office with 61.22% of the vote.

Business and infrastructure 
In the south is the Federal Highway 41. In the nearby town of Bad Kreuznach is a station of the railway Bingen-Saarbrücken.

The largest employer of Sommerloch is HUM-Festerbau.

Literature 
 200 Jahre St. Ägidius Sommerloch. 1789–1989. o. O. 1989 – In German

References

External links

See also 
 A list of Cultural Monuments in Sommerloch (German language)

Bad Kreuznach (district)